Heimkehr (English: "Homecoming") is a 1941 Nazi German anti-Polish propaganda film directed by Gustav Ucicky.

It received the rare honor "Film of the Nation" in Nazi Germany, bestowed on films considered to have made an outstanding contribution to the national cause.  Filled with heavy-handed caricature, it justifies extermination of Poles with a depiction of relentless persecution of ethnic Germans, who escape death only because of the German invasion.

Plot 
In the Wołyń Voivodeship in eastern Poland, the German minority is oppressed by the Polish majority. The physician Dr. Thomas does not have any hospital available and his daughter Marie, who teaches at a German school, and needs an important operation, watches when her school is seized by Polish authorities and demolished by an angry mob. Dr. Thomas protests to the mayor, noting the constitutionally guaranteed minority rights; however his protest falls on deaf ears. Marie and her fiancé, Dr. Fritz Mutius, drive to the provincial capital, in order to put their protest to the Voivode (governor), but they are not even received there either. Deciding to stay in the capital in order to call on the court the next day, that evening they go to the cinema. They are accompanied there by her friend Karl Michalek, who has been pressed into service by the Polish Army. When they refuse to sing the Polish national anthem Mazurek Dąbrowskiego with the rest of the audience, Fritz gets grievously hurt by the furious Polish crowd. Marie tries to take her betrothed to a hospital, but he is refused admission and succumbs to his injuries.

Back home, the acts of violence against the German minority continue to increase: Marie's father too becomes the victim of a Polish attack and is blinded as a result; the wife of innkeeper Ludwig Launhardt, Martha, dies after being struck by stones thrown by Poles. When during the Invasion of Poland the German villagers meet secretly in a barn, in order to hear Hitler's speech of 1 September 1939 before the Reichstag, they are discovered, arrested and imprisoned. Marie keeps up their spirits with the promise that they will escape, that Germans are deeply concerned about them, and that they will be able to return home and hear neither Yiddish nor Polish, but only German. They are abused by the prison guards, but escape through an underground cellar and, scarcely avoiding a massacre, are saved by invading Wehrmacht soldiers. The German escapees ready for their resettlement into the "homeland", while widowed Ludwig Launhardt asks for Marie's hand. At the end of the film the German trek crosses the border into the Reich. The conclusion shows an enormous picture of Hitler set up at the checkpoint.

Cast
The main roles were as follows: Paula Wessely, Maria Thomas; Peter Petersen, Dr. Thomas; Attila Hörbiger, Ludwig Launhardt; Carl Raddatz, Dr. Fritz Mutius; and Hermann Erhardt, Karl Michalek.

Other parts were played by Otto Wernicke, Old Manz; Ruth Hellberg, Martha Launhardt; Elsa Wagner, Frau Schmid; Eduard Köck, Herr Schmid; Franz Pfaudler, Balthasar Manz; Gerhild Weber, Josepha Manz; Werner Fuetterer, Oskar Friml; Berta Drews, Elfriede; Eugen Preiß, Salomonson; and Bogusław Samborski as the mayor.

Casting for the minor parts played by Jewish and Polish actors was done by Igo Sym, who during the filming was shot in his Warsaw apartment by members of the Polish Union of Armed Struggle resistance movement. After the war, the Polish performers were punished (ranging from official reprimand to prison sentence) for collaboration in an anti-Polish propaganda undertaking.

Historical context

Hitler intended Poland to serve as the Lebensraum for the German people, and declared that only the soil, not the people, could be Germanized.  This did not mean a total extermination of all people there, as Eastern Europe was regarded as having people of Aryan/Nordic descent, particularly among their leaders.  Germanisation began with the classification of people suitable as defined on the Nazi Volksliste, and treated according to their categorisation.  Those unfit for Germanisation were to be expelled from the areas marked out for German settlement; those who resisted Germanization were to be sent to concentration camps or executed.

To foment support, Nazi propaganda presented the annexation as necessary to protect the German minorities there.  Alleged massacres of Germans, such as Bloody Sunday were used in such propaganda, and Heimkehr drew on such attempts although allowing the Volksdeutsche characters depicted to survive.  The introduction explicitly states that hundreds of thousands of Germans in Poland suffered likewise.  Many terror tactics depicted were those used by the Nazis themselves against minorities.

Similar treatment was given to anti-Serbian propaganda, in Menschen im Sturm.

Baltic Germans were also to be settled into this land.  The secret supplementary protocol to the 1939 Molotov–Ribbentrop Pact included a resettlement plan by which approximately 60,000 ethnic Germans were resettled into the Reich.  Nazi propaganda included using scare tactics about the Soviet Union, and led to tens of thousands leaving.  After racial evaluation, they were divided into groups: A, Altreich, who were to be settled in Germany and allowed neither farms nor business (to allow for closer watch), S Sonderfall, who were used as forced labor, and O Ost-Falle, the best classification, to be settled in the Eastern Wall—the occupied regions, to protect German from the East—and allowed independence.  Similar support therefore was fomented with the use of film to depict Baltic and Volga Germans as persecuted by the Bolshevists, such as the films  Frisians in Peril, Flüchtlinge, and The Red Terror.

Production and reception 
The creation of the film was based on pictures by the artist Otto Engelhardt-Kyffhäuser, who in January 1940, on Heinrich Himmler's orders, took numerous sketches when he accompanied a trek of resettlers from Volhynia. The indoor shots ran from 2 January to the middle of July 1941 in the Wien-Film studios at the Rosenhügel in Liesing, at Sievering Studios and the Schönbrunn Palace gardens in Vienna. The external shots took place between February and June 1941 in Polish Chorzele and Ortelsburg (Szczytno) in East Prussia. The picture was submitted to censorship at the Film Review Office on 26 August 1941, it was G-rated and received a top attribute as "political and artistical particularly valuable".

The first public performance took place on 31 August 1941 at the Venice Film Festival in the Cinema San Marco, winning an award from the Italian Ministry for  Culture. The festive Austrian premiere followed on 10 October 1941 at the Viennese Scala-Kino in the presence of Gauleiter Baldur von Schirach, the premiere in Berlin on 23 October 1941 simultaneously at the Ufa-Palast am Zoo and the Ufa-Theater Wagnitzstraße. The film grossed 4.9 million Reichsmark, thereby below expectation. Nevertheless, Propaganda Minister Joseph Goebbels in his diary referred to Wessely's performance in the prison scene as "the best ever filmed".

After the end of World War II the Allies banned any showing of the film. Director Ucicky was also banned from working, although this ban was waived by Austria in July 1947, whereafter he resorted to the Heimatfilm genre. Paula Wessely and her husband Attila Hörbiger became the acclaimed dream couple of the Vienna Burgtheater ensemble. The Austrian author and Nobel laureate Elfriede Jelinek stated that Heimkehr is “the worst propaganda feature of the Nazis ever”. She utilized some text fragments in her 1985 play Burgtheater. Posse mit Gesang, causing a major public scandal. The film's rights are held by Taurus Film GmbH.

See also
Nazism and cinema
Aftermath

References

 Kanzog, Klaus, 1994. Staatspolitisch besonders wertvoll: ein Handbuch zu 30 deutschen Spielfilmen der Jahre 1934 bis 1945. Munich: Schaudig & Ledig. 
 Trimmel, Gerald, 1998. Heimkehr: Strategien eines nationalsozialistischen Films. Vienna: W. Eichbauer Verlag.

External links 
 
www.filmportal.de
www.film.at
 
 

1941 films
Nazi World War II propaganda films
Films of Nazi Germany
Films directed by Gustav Ucicky
Films set in 1939
Films set in Poland
Films shot at Sievering Studios
1940s German-language films
UFA GmbH films
German drama films
1941 drama films
German black-and-white films
Films about discrimination